= William Kisaalita =

Chemical Engineer and Professor at the University of Georgia

- Born: December 15, 1953 (age 72); Kampala, Uganda
- Occupations: Chemical engineer, professor of engineering at the University of Georgia

William Ssempa Kisaalita (born December 15, 1953, in Kampala, Uganda) is a chemical engineer and professor of engineering at the University of Georgia.

== Biography ==
Kisaalita was born in Kampala, Uganda. He completed his Bachelor of Science degree in mechanical engineering at Makerere University in Kampala, Uganda. He obtained his Ph.D. in chemical engineering in 1987 from the University of British Columbia, Vancouver, B.C., Canada. He joined the University of Georgia as a professor in 1991.

== Professional work ==
Kisaalita's primary research area has been in the application of 3D cell cultures in pre-clinical drug discovery. He authored a graduate textbook in this area titled 3D Cell-Based Biosensors in Drug Discovery Programs. His secondary line of research is in biogas-powered cooling of milk and other perishables in low-resource settings with no access to electricity. His research areas include the following:

- Tissue engineering
- Cell-surface interactions
- Assays for high throughput screening (HTS)
- Renewable energy utilization with emphasis on biogas-powered cooling
- Global service learning

His work has been supported by several organizations including the Bill and Melinda Gates Foundation, World Bank, the National Science Foundation, the U.S. Department of Agriculture, and the Environmental Protection Agency.

== Awards ==
- 2016 University of Georgia's President's Fulfilling the Dream Award.
- 2015 Lioba Moshi Award for Service in African Studies.
- 2015 University of Georgia College of Engineering's Distinguished Faculty Scholar Award.
- 2015 University of Georgia Richard Reiff Internationalization Award.
- 2013 Powering Agriculture Award: An Energy Grand Challenge for Development initiative.
- 2008 University of Georgia Scholarship of Engagement Award.
- 2004 University Mentor of the Year for Undergraduate Research, University of Georgia Honors Program.
- 2002 Lowry H. Gillespie, Jr. Award.
